Grafsky Bereg (Graf Bierege) is a rural locality (a selo) in Namsky District in the Sakha Republic, Russia, located  from Namtsy, the administrative center of the district. It used to be a part of Khatyn-Arynsky Rural Okrug, but had since then been separated from it and incorporated as the Selo of Grafsky Bereg, an administrative division equivalent to rural okrugs. Within the framework of municipal divisions, it is a part of Khatyn-Arynsky Rural Settlement in Namsky Municipal District. Its population as of the 2002 Census was 855.

References

Notes

Sources
Official website of the Sakha Republic. Registry of the Administrative-Territorial Divisions of the Sakha Republic. Namsky District. 

Rural localities in Namsky District
Populated places on the Lena River